Sarah D'Alelio (born December 13, 1980) is a professional mixed martial artist. She competed in the 135-pound women's bantamweight division for Invicta Fighting Championships and has also fought for Strikeforce.

Mixed martial arts career

Jackson's MMA Series
D'Alelio was scheduled to face Julie Kedzie at Jackson's MMA Series 2 on September 4, 2010, but the fight was canceled after Kedzie signed on to take part in the filming of the Ultimate Women Challenge reality show.

D'Alelio's fight with Kedzie was then was rebooked for Jackson's MMA Series 3 on December 18, 2010, in Albuquerque, New Mexico. She lost to Kedzie via unanimous decision.

Strikeforce
Strikeforce announced at its April 9, 2011, event in San Diego that Gina Carano would make her return on June 18 at the American Airlines Center in Dallas, Texas, during the Overeem vs. Werdum Strikeforce event against D'Alelio. Initially, Strikeforce announced that Carano had failed her pre-fight medical examination due to an unknown issue and the fight was pulled from the card. As the story developed, it became public that Carano was medically cleared by the Athletic Commission but was removed from the card for unknown reasons.

D'Alelio was then scheduled to make her Strikeforce debut against Ronda Rousey on July 30, 2011, at Strikeforce: Fedor vs. Henderson in Hoffman Estates, Illinois. The fight was pushed back and eventually took place on the Strikeforce Challengers 18 main card on August 12, 2011, in Las Vegas, Nevada. Rousey defeated D'Alelio by technical submission due to an armbar early in the first round. D'Alelio contended that she did not verbally tap out and that the fight was prematurely stopped by the referee (Steve Mazzagatti).

Invicta Fighting Championships
D'Alelio made her Invicta FC debut at Invicta FC 1: Coenen vs. Ruyssen against Vanessa Mariscal, winning via submission (punches) in the second round.

She then fought and defeated Vanessa Porto via submission (reverse triangle armbar) in round one at Invicta FC 2: Baszler vs. McMann on July 28, 2012.

D'Alelio faced Shayna Baszler at Invicta FC 3: Penne vs. Sugiyama on October 6, 2012. She lost the fight via submission due to a rear-naked choke early in round two.

On January 5, 2013, D'Alelio faced Amanda Nunes at Invicta FC 4: Esparza vs. Hyatt. D'Alelio won the fight via unanimous decision.

D'Alelio faced Lauren Taylor at Invicta FC 6: Coenen vs. Cyborg on July 13, 2013. D'Alelio lost the close fight via unanimous decision.

At Invicta FC 7, D'Alelio replaced Kelly Kobold in a fight against Tonya Evinger. D'Alelio lost the fight via unanimous decision.

D'Alelio was booked to face Rin Nakai at Pancrase: 258 on May 11, 2014. She lost the fight by unanimous decision.

Bellator MMA
D'Alelio made her Bellator MMA debut at Bellator 165 on November 19, 2016. She faced Jamielene Nievera and won the fight via submission in the second round.

D'Alelio faced Roxanne Modafferi at Invicta FC 23: Porto vs. Niedźwiedź on May 20, 2017. She lost the fight by a third-round technical knockout.

Mixed martial arts record

|-
| Loss
| align=center | 11–7
| Roxanne Modafferi
| TKO (elbows)
| Invicta FC 23: Porto vs. Niedźwiedź
| 
| align=center | 3
| align=center | 1:37
| Kansas City, Missouri, United States
|
|-
| Win
| align=center | 11–6
| Jamielene Nievera
| Submission (armbar)
| Bellator 165
| 
| align=center | 2
| align=center | 4:46
| San Jose, California, United States
|
|-
| Win
| align=center | 10–6
| Jenny Liou
| Decision (unanimous)
| Super Fight League 50
| 
| align=center | 3
| align=center | 5:00
| Tacoma, Washington, United States
|
|-
| Win
| align=center | 9–6
| Andrea Lee
| Submission (rear-naked choke)
| Invicta FC 16: Hamasaki vs. Brown
| 
| align=center | 3
| align=center | 4:21
| Las Vegas, Nevada, United States
|
|-
| Win
| align=center | 8–6
| Christina Marks
| Submission (rear-naked choke)
| BAMMA USA: Badbeat 14
| 
| align=center | 1
| align=center | 4:38
| Commerce, California, United States
|
|-
| Loss
| align=center | 7–6
| Rin Nakai
| Decision (unanimous)
| Pancrase: 258
| 
| align=center | 3
| align=center | 5:00
| Tokyo, Japan
|
|-
| Loss
| align=center | 7–5
| Tonya Evinger
| Decision (unanimous)
| Invicta FC 7: Honchak vs. Smith
| 
| align=center | 3
| align=center | 5:00
| Kansas City, Missouri, United States
|
|-
| Loss
| align=center | 7–4
| Lauren Taylor
| Decision (unanimous)
| Invicta FC 6: Coenen vs. Cyborg
| 
| align=center | 3
| align=center | 5:00
| Kansas City, Missouri, United States
|
|-
| Win
| align=center | 7–3
| Amanda Nunes
| Decision (unanimous)
| Invicta FC 4: Esparza vs. Hyatt
| 
| align=center | 3
| align=center | 5:00
| Kansas City, Kansas, United States
|
|-
| Loss
| align=center | 6–3
| Shayna Baszler
| Submission (rear-naked choke)
| Invicta FC 3: Penne vs. Sugiyama
| 
| align=center | 2
| align=center | 0:37
| Kansas City, Kansas, United States
|
|-
| Win
| align=center | 6–2
| Vanessa Porto
| Submission (reverse triangle armbar)
| Invicta FC 2: Baszler vs. McMann
| 
| align=center | 1
| align=center | 3:16
| Kansas City, Kansas, United States
|
|-
| Win
| align=center | 5–2
| Vanessa Mariscal
| Submission (punches)
| Invicta FC 1: Coenen vs. Ruyssen
| 
| align=center | 2
| align=center | 3:19
| Kansas City, Kansas, United States
| 
|-
| Loss
| align=center | 4–2
| Ronda Rousey
| Verbal Submission (armbar)
| Strikeforce Challengers: Gurgel vs. Duarte
| 
| align=center | 1
| align=center | 0:25
| Las Vegas, Nevada, United States
|
|-
| Loss
| align=center | 4–1
| Julie Kedzie
| Decision (unanimous)
| Jackson's MMA Series 3
| 
| align=center | 3
| align=center | 5:00
| Albuquerque, New Mexico, United States
|
|-
| Win
| align=center | 4–0
| Raquel Pa'aluhi
| Submission (armbar)
| X-1: Heroes
| 
| align=center | 1
| align=center | 2:13
| Honolulu, Hawaii, United States
|
|-
| Win
| align=center | 3–0
| Melissa Steele
| TKO (punches)
| CageSport 11
| 
| align=center | 1
| align=center | 1:25
| Tacoma, Washington, United States
|
|-
| Win
| align=center | 2–0
| Colleen Schneider
| Submission (rear-naked choke)
| FE: Arctic Combat 2
| 
| align=center | 2
| align=center | N/A
| Fairbanks, Alaska, United States
|
|-
| Win
| align=center | 1–0
| Sarah Oriza
| Submission (guillotine choke)
| CageSport 9
| 
| align=center | 1
| align=center | 0:29
| Tacoma, Washington, United States
|

See also
 List of female mixed martial artists

References

External links
 Sarah D'Alelio Awakening Profile

1980 births
Living people
American female mixed martial artists
Sportspeople from Maine
People from Belfast, Maine
Flyweight mixed martial artists
Lesbian sportswomen
American LGBT sportspeople
LGBT mixed martial artists
21st-century American women